Spodnje Jarše is a settlement on the right bank of the Kamnik Bistrica River in the Municipality of Domžale in the Upper Carniola region of Slovenia.

References

External links
Spodnje Jarše on Geopedia

Populated places in the Municipality of Domžale